

East table

West table

Superleague final table

Relegation East

Relegation West

External links
Football Association of Slovenia 

Slovenian Republic Football League seasons
Yugo
3
Football
Football